A shayar is a poet who composes sher in Urdu, Hindi, or Persian. Commonly, a shayar is someone who writes ghazals, nazms using the Urdu language.

History 
Amir Khusro (1253–1325) is considered to be one of the foremost shayars of the world; he wrote in Persian, Hindustani. Mirza Ghalib is considered the ultimate authority on Urdu poetry. He lived in Delhi and died in 1869.

Shayars create a form of poetry that is called shayari. It traditional that this form of poetry is often read to an audience in a special setting called mehfil. Although there are many professional shayars, who create shayari for their livelihood, it is an immensely popular form of poetry for amateurs. The inspiration for amateur shayari is still largely romance and beauty. However, professional shayars tend to write more on social issues that is more popular for a larger section of society.

List of shayars 

 Mir Taqi Mir
 Mohammad Imran Pratapgarhi
 Shams Tabrizi
 Baksh Nasikh
 Khwaja Haidar Ali Aatish
 Ghalib
 Mohammad Ibrahim Zauq
 Allama Iqbal
 Josh Malihabadi
 Firaq Gorakhpuri
 Hasrat Mohani
 Jigar Moradabadi
 Jaun Elia
 Ali Sardar Jafri
 Mir Anees
 Mirza Dabeer
 Momin Khan Momin
 Mirza Sauda
 Daagh Dehlvi
 Faiz Ahmad Faiz
 Sahir Ludhianvi
 Shakeel Badayuni
 Majrooh Sultanpuri
 Ahmad Faraz
 Hasrat Jaipuri
 Bashir Badr
 Kaifi Azmi
 Javed Akhtar
 Muztar Khairabadi
 Nida Fazli
 Wasim Barelvi
 Gulzar
 Rahat Indori
 Sardar Anjum
 Munawwar Rana
 Ahmad Faraz
 Ada Jafri
 Firaq Gorakhpuri
 Amrita Pritam
 Meena Kumari
 Hasrat Mohani
 Faiz Ahmad Faiz
 Nasir Kazmi
 Wasif Ali Wasif

References 

Urdu-language poetry
Hindi poetry
Persian poetry